Real Betis Baloncesto S.A.D., simply known as  Real Betis, is a professional basketball team based in Seville, Spain. The team plays in the Liga ACB. It plays its home games at San Pablo.

History 
Club Deportivo de Baloncesto Sevilla was founded in 1987 when the team bought the seat of Dribling de Madrid in the second division, in that time called Primera División B. In 1989, the team promoted to Liga ACB for the first time ever.

In 1996 and 1999 the club finished the league as runner-up being defeated both times in the finals 0–3 by FC Barcelona.

In 2011, Sevilla lost the 2010–11 Eurocup final, played in Treviso, Italy, against Unics Kazan.

On 21 July 2016, Baloncesto Sevilla and Real Betis agreed a collaboration agreement for helping the football squad to solve the financial problems of the basketball team. The team would be called Real Betis Energía Plus as a result of the agreement and a new sponsor. On 31 December 2016, Real Betis agreed the buy of the 99.99% of the shares of the club and implemented it on 12 January 2017.

In 2017 the club relegated from Liga ACB for the first time in its history, but remained in the league in application of the precautionary measures issued by the judicial demand of the Andalusian club after the change of the requirements to join the ACB during the pre-season. However, the club was relegated again in the next season after a very poor performance with only seven wins in 34 matches, finishing in the last position of the league table.

On 6 September 2018, the club unanimously approved to take the necessary steps to obtain the pertinent authorization from the Spanish royal house to change its name to Real Betis Baloncesto S.A.D. This change was finally approved on 15 December 2018.

During the 2018–19 season, their first ever in LEB Oro, Real Betis beat the record of biggest winning streak with 17, thus meaning they beat all their league opponents consecutively. The club quickly came back to the top tier after winning the championship with four rounds left.

Sponsorship naming 
From 1987 to 2014, the club was sponsored by Caja San Fernando, renamed in 2007 as Cajasol and merged in Banca Cívica years later.

 Caja San Fernando (1987–2007)
 Cajasol (2007–10)
 Cajasol Banca Cívica (2010–2011)
 Banca Cívica (2011–2012)
 Cajasol (2012–2014)
 Baloncesto Sevilla (2014–2016)
 Real Betis Energía Plus (2016–2019)
 Coosur Real Betis (2019–2022)

Logos

Players

Retired numbers

Current roster

Depth chart

Head coaches 

 José Alberto Pesquera 1990–1995, 1998
 Aleksandar Petrović 1995–1997
 Salva Maldonado 1997–1998
 Javier Imbroda 1998–2001
 Javier Fijo 2001, 2005
 Marco Crespi 2001–2002
 Gustavo Aranzana 2002–2004
 Velimir Perasović 2004–2005
 Óscar Quintana 2005
 Manel Comas 2005–2007, 2008
 Moncho López 2007
 Rubén Magnano 2007–2008
 Ángel Jareño 2008
 Pedro Martínez 2008–2009
 Joan Plaza 2009–2012
 Aíto García Reneses 2012–2014
 Scott Roth 2014–2015
 Luis Casimiro 2015–2016
 Žan Tabak 2016–2017
 Alejandro Martínez 2017
 Óscar Quintana 2017–2018
 Javier Carrasco 2018
 Curro Segura 2018–2020
 Joan Plaza 2020–present

Season by season

Records and awards

Records 
 29 seasons in ACB
 3 seasons in the second tier:
 2 in Primera División B
 1 in LEB Oro

Trophies 
 LEB Oro: (1)
2018–19
 Copa Princesa de Asturias: (1)
2019
 Andalusia Cup: (5)
1998, 1999, 2002, 2005, 2009

Individual awards 
ACB Most Valuable Player
 Michael Anderson – 1996

ACB Three Point Shootout Champion
 Raúl Pérez – 2003

ACB Slam Dunk Champion
 Tomáš Satoranský – 2010

EuroCup Rising Star Award
Kristaps Porziņģis – 2015

All-EuroCup First Team
Tariq Kirksay – 2011

All-EuroCup Second Team
Paul Davis – 2011

Notable players

References

External links 
 Official website
 CB Sevilla at FEB.es 

 
Basketball teams in Andalusia
Liga ACB teams
Former LEB Oro teams
Basketball teams established in 1987
1987 establishments in Spain